Jai Balaji Group is a steel manufacturer  with Captive Power Generation and plants in nine locations. It also has plans to set up a Mega Steel, Cement and Power Project at Raghunathpur. The group has a presence at Raniganj, Liluah and Rourkela. In 2011, the company bought Nilachal Iron & Power, which is based in Saraikela.

References

Steel companies of India
Manufacturing companies based in Kolkata
Manufacturing companies established in 1999
1999 establishments in West Bengal